Daniella Levine Cava (born September 14, 1955) is an American lawyer, social worker, and politician who has served as the mayor of Miami-Dade County, Florida since 2020. Previously, she was a Miami-Dade County Commissioner from 2014 until her election as mayor. She is the first woman and the first person of Jewish descent to serve as mayor of Miami-Dade County.

Early life and education 
Daniella Levine was born on September 14, 1955, in New York City. She traveled throughout Latin America in her youth, including to Rio de Janeiro and Santiago. She later attended Yale University, where she served as the President of the Student Council, graduating in 1977 with a Bachelor of Arts in psychology. She later attended Columbia University, receiving a Juris Doctor in 1981 and a Master of Social Work in 1983. She moved to Miami in 1980 with her husband, Dr. Robert Cava.

Legal and non-profit career 
Upon her arrival to Miami in 1980, Levine Cava became an attorney with Legal Services of Greater Miami, later leaving in 1985 after becoming legal director for the Guardian Ad Litem program, a court-run child welfare legal program. During her time as a lawyer, she served on the Florida Bar Committee on Legal Needs of Children. In 1992, following Hurricane Andrew, she was appointed as the Miami-Dade County program manager for the Florida Department of Children and Families, holding the position until 1994. The following year, she founded a youth outreach program with Barry University.

In 1996, Levine Cava founded the Human Services Coalition, later renamed Catalyst Miami, which, through partnerships with the United Way and local businesses, aids low-income families with monetary advice. At Catalyst Miami, she launched the Prosperity Campaign which helps people increase their income and savings, allowing families to build financial security. She served as the president and chief executive officer of Catalyst Miami until 2013.

Political career

Miami-Dade County commission 
In 2013, Levine Cava, a Democrat, ran against incumbent Miami-Dade County District 8 Commissioner Lynda Bell, a Republican. The district includes much of southern Miami-Dade County, including suburban localities like West Kendall and Cutler Bay, and agricultural communities like Homestead and Redland. Levine Cava entered the race in 2014. Levine Cava narrowly defeated Bell in the August 26 election, receiving 52% of the vote to Bell's 48%.

In 2016, Levine Cava sponsored legislation in the Miami-Dade County Commission that requires local candidates for office to register when they raise money for political action committees.

Levine Cava won reelection in 2018, receiving over 61% of the vote.

In November 2019, Levine Cava published a letter in the Miami Herald criticizing the Florida State Legislature for diverting funds for affordable housing. This diverted nearly $1.4 billion to balance the state budget. She also created the Infill Housing Program which aims to build affordable housing on County-owned land in her district.

During her tenure, Levine Cava has advocated for the protection of the environment. In 2017, she sponsored the resolution to support the Paris climate agreement. In response to the presence of fecal bacteria in Biscayne Bay in early 2020, she also sponsored legislation to improve water testing in the area.

In 2018, Levine Cava created an initiative to protect pedestrians and bikers from harm's way. The initiative featured a plan for engaging with the business community to create incentives that could train people to be better drivers and an agenda for improving biking accessibility on roads.

Levine Cava gained endorsements from labor unions like the Service Employees International Union, and the AFL–CIO, and environmental groups like the Sierra Club.

Mayor of Miami-Dade County

Election 
In early 2020, Levine Cava announced her run for the 2020 Miami-Dade County mayoral election, to succeed incumbent Mayor Carlos Giménez, who was term-limited. She earned the endorsements of many major organizations and newspapers, including the Miami Herald, and received the endorsement of many prominent Democrats, including congresswomen Debbie Mucarsel-Powell and Donna Shalala. Levine Cava has also received significant funding from Donald Sussman, a hedge fund executive who was the largest single donor to Hillary Clinton in the 2016 United States presidential election.

In the August 18 primary, Levine Cava placed second behind fellow Commissioner Esteban Bovo, receiving 28% to Bovo's 29%, with former County Mayor Alex Penelas trailing in third with 24%. Because neither Levine Cava or Bovo received over 50% of the vote, this triggered a runoff election between the two candidates, which was held on November 3, 2020. Levine Cava won the runoff election with 54% of the vote.

Tenure

2021 Surfside condominium building collapse 
In late June, Levine Cava garnered national attention for her response to the Surfside condominium building collapse.

Electoral history

Personal life 
Levine Cava is Jewish. She is married to Robert Cava, a Miami-Dade physician of Italian American descent. They have two children, Eliza and Edward.

Awards 
For her nonprofit work, Levine Cava has the Most Distinguished Pioneer Award from the National Alliance to Nurture the Aged and the Youth and the Joanne Hayes Democracy and Mentoring Award from the League of Women Voters.

References 

1955 births
21st-century American lawyers
21st-century American women lawyers
Columbia University School of Social Work alumni
County commissioners in Florida
Jewish American people in Florida politics
Florida lawyers
Living people
21st-century American politicians
21st-century American women politicians
Florida Democrats
Mayors of Miami-Dade County, Florida
Women mayors of places in Florida
Politicians from New York City
Lawyers from New York City
Yale University alumni
21st-century American Jews
Columbia Law School alumni